Antônio de Jesus Dias (28 January 1942 – 3 September 2020) was a Brazilian pastor and politician who served as a Deputy. He died from COVID-19 during the COVID-19 pandemic in Brazil.

References

1942 births
2020 deaths
Democratic Social Party politicians
Members of the Chamber of Deputies (Brazil) from Goiás
Members of the Legislative Assembly of Goiás
People from Anápolis
Deaths from the COVID-19 pandemic in Goiás